Beyond Our Ken is a 2008 Australian documentary film directed by Luke Walker and Melissa Maclean by the controversial organization Kenja Communication. Released to Australian theatres on 18 September 2008, the film was nominated for Best Documentary at the Film Critics Circle of Australia Awards and also by the Australian Film Institute.

See also
AACTA Award for Best Direction in a Documentary

References

External links
 
 

Australian documentary films
2008 films
2008 documentary films
2000s English-language films